The WHA's West Division was formed in 1972. The division existed for five seasons until 1977. In 1972, the WHA was formed with 12 teams, split into two divisions of six teams each, with the other division being the East Division.  The division existed until 1977, as the WHA decreased to only eight teams and divisions weren't used anymore.

Division lineups

1972–1973
Alberta Oilers
Chicago Cougars
Houston Aeros
Los Angeles Sharks
Minnesota Fighting Saints
Winnipeg Jets

1973–1974
Edmonton Oilers
Houston Aeros
Los Angeles Sharks
Minnesota Fighting Saints
Vancouver Blazers
Winnipeg Jets

Changes from the 1972–1973 season
The Philadelphia Blazers move to Vancouver, British Columbia and become the Vancouver Blazers, joining the West Division.
The Chicago Cougars move to the East Division from the West Division as a result of the Blazers moving to Vancouver.
The Alberta Oilers rename their team to the Edmonton Oilers.

1974–1975
Houston Aeros
Michigan Stags/Baltimore Blades
Minnesota Fighting Saints
Phoenix Roadrunners
San Diego Mariners

Changes from the 1973–1974 season
The Edmonton Oilers, Vancouver Blazers and Winnipeg Jets move from the West Division to the newly formed Canadian Division.
The Los Angeles Sharks relocate to Detroit, Michigan, becoming the Michigan Stags.  In January 1975, the Stags would relocate to Baltimore, Maryland, becoming the Baltimore Blades.
The Jersey Knights relocate to San Diego, California, becoming the San Diego Mariners.  The team moved from the East Division to the West Division.
The Phoenix Roadrunners join the West Division as an expansion team.

1975–1976
Denver Spurs/Ottawa Civics
Houston Aeros
Minnesota Fighting Saints
Phoenix Roadrunners
San Diego Mariners

Changes from the 1974–1975 season
The Baltimore Blades folded during the summer of 1975.
The Denver Spurs join the East Division as an expansion team.  In January 1976, the Spurs would relocate to Ottawa, Ontario, becoming the Ottawa Civics.  The team folded during the season shortly after their relocation.

1976–1977
Calgary Cowboys
Edmonton Oilers
Houston Aeros
Phoenix Roadrunners
San Diego Mariners
Winnipeg Jets

Changes from the 1975–1976 season
The Edmonton Oilers and Winnipeg Jets re-join the West Division as the Canadian Division is dissolved.
The Calgary Cowboys join the West Division from the Canadian Division.

After the 1976–1977 season
The league folded four teams during the off-season, reducing the number of teams to eight, as the WHA decided not to use a divisional format.

Regular season Division Champions
1973 - Winnipeg Jets (43–31–4, 90 pts)
1974 - Houston Aeros (48–25–5, 101 pts)
1975 - Houston Aeros (53–25–0, 106 pts)
1976 - Houston Aeros (53–27–0, 106 pts)
1977 - Houston Aeros (50–24–6, 106 pts)

Playoff Division Champions
1973 - Winnipeg Jets
1974 - Houston Aeros
1977 - Winnipeg Jets

Avco Cup winners produced
1974 - Houston Aeros
1975 - Houston Aeros

West Division Titles Won By Team

See also
 WHA East Division
 WHA Canadian Division

References

 WHA History

World Hockey Association